Tenacibaculum discolor is a Gram-negative and rod-shaped bacterium from the genus of Tenacibaculum which has been isolated from the kidney of a sole Solea senegalensis from Galicia in Spain.

References 

Flavobacteria
Bacteria described in 2008